Be Cool, Scooby-Doo! is an American animated television series produced by Warner Bros. Animation as the twelfth incarnation of Hanna-Barbera's Scooby-Doo animated series. In the show, the Scooby-Doo gang decide to travel during their last summer break together, encountering havoc-wreaking monsters along the way. Described as having a more comedic tone than its previous incarnation, Scooby-Doo! Mystery Incorporated, the show employs character traits from the original 1969 series on top of redesigned character models.

The series was announced in March 2014 to premiere on Cartoon Network. However, a promotional image at the 2015 upfront announced the show to air on Boomerang and the news was later confirmed on June 29, 2015. It was originally scheduled to air on Boomerang, but the series instead premiered on Cartoon Network on October 5, 2015. On March 7, 2017, it was announced that the remaining unaired episodes would be released on Boomerang's video on demand streaming service. The final eleven episodes premiered on the Boomerang television network in March 2018 and were added to the Boomerang streaming service on September 26, 2018.

Plot 

The Scooby-Doo gang decide to travel in the Mystery Machine, seeking fun and adventure during what could possibly be their last summer break together. However, havoc-wreaking monsters seem to be drawn to them, appearing almost every stop of the way. Nonetheless, they do not let it prevent them from completing their journey, and while they are at it, they solve every mystery they encounter.

Voice cast 

 Frank Welker – Scooby-Doo and Fred Jones
 Matthew Lillard – Shaggy Rogers
 Grey DeLisle – Daphne Blake
 Kate Micucci – Velma Dinkley

Production 
Be Cool, Scooby-Doo! was announced in March 2014, along with other reboots of Warner Bros. classics, such as The Tom and Jerry Show and Wabbit.
Sam Register, promoted to president of Warner Bros. Animation and Warner Digital Series a month prior, is its supervising producer. The animation direction is performed by Shaunt Nigoghossian, with Richard Lee overseeing art direction.
Episodes run for a half-hour.

The twelfth series in the Scooby-Doo franchise, the show was previewed in an article from a Comic-Con edition of TV Guide, writing that it would be less dark than its previous incarnation, Scooby-Doo! Mystery Incorporated.
Zac Moncrief, a producer, called it "a more comedic ensemble", with character traits extracted from the original 1969 series.
This decision nulled the romantic subplots present in Mystery Incorporated.
Scooby-Doo has limited dialogue. Meanwhile, Fred has upgraded the Mystery Machine with modern appliances.

In addition, the series employs redesigned character models for the gang, retaining their original clothes, with a few design tweaks. Moncrief described this as a "simplistic, edgy design to match the comedic styling of this latest version." However, he denied it as "a campy or meta version" of Scooby-Doo.

This marks the first Scooby-Doo television series not to feature Casey Kasem in any capacity; Kasem, who voiced Shaggy from 1969 to 2009, retired from voice acting due to declining health during the production of Mystery Incorporated (in which he portrayed Shaggy's father) and died on June 15, 2014. Kasem's death leaves Frank Welker as the only surviving original cast member still with the franchise. It is also the first series since A Pup Named Scooby-Doo where Velma is voiced by an actress other than Mindy Cohn, and marks the debut of Kate Micucci as the character's voice actress.

Broadcast 

Be Cool, Scooby-Doo! made its worldwide debut on October 4, 2015, on Boomerang in the United Kingdom and Ireland and premiered on Teletoon in Canada on October 8. The series premiered on Boomerang in Australia on December 28. The series also aired in 2019 on e.tv.

Episodes

Series overview

Season 1 (2015–17) 
This season premiered on Cartoon Network in the United States on October 5, 2015. After airing twenty out of the twenty-six episodes from the first season, the series was put on a long hiatus following the premiere of "Giant Problems" on March 12, 2016. The final six episodes of the first season were aired on Cartoon Network's sister station Boomerang in an overnight graveyard slot on June 20, 2017.

Season 2 (2017–18) 
On March 7, 2017, it was announced that the rest of Be Cool, Scooby-Doo! would be premiering exclusively on the streaming service for Boomerang, a sister channel of Cartoon Network. The season premiered on the streaming service on September 28, 2017. Despite this, the final eleven episodes of the season premiered on the Boomerang television network. The season concluded on March 18, 2018.

Home media

Region 1

Region 2

Region 4

References

External links 

 

Scooby-Doo television series
2010s American animated television series
2015 American television series debuts
2018 American television series endings
2010s American mystery television series
American children's animated comedy television series
American children's animated fantasy television series
American children's animated horror television series
American children's animated mystery television series
English-language television shows
Animated television series reboots
Television series by Warner Bros. Animation
Cartoon Network original programming
Boomerang (TV network) original programming